PVC decking is composed entirely of polyvinyl chloride (PVC) and contains no wood. PVC decking is a more expensive option in the decking industry, but it provides significant fade and stain resistance and lower maintenance requirements compared to other products.

History
PVC decking was introduced to the market around 2005 and continues to be a contender as a top deck building material. Its uniquely all-plastic makeup makes it distinctly different from wood decking or other composite decking options. PVC decking has changed in appearance since its introduction and is now available in different colors.

Production
Unlike some other wood-alternative decking materials, PVC decking is not made with any wood. It is made completely from plastic instead of from a combination of materials. 

Producing PVC decking is a relatively difficult process called co-extrusion. The deck board core is coated and bound with an outer plastic shell, but the materials can be temperamental and hard to work with.  Commercial production is challenging, not only for this reason, but also because about one eighth of the deck boards produced are considered unsellable and therefore scrapped. The fragile nature of this production process requires careful ingredient mixing and precise execution.

Advantages
PVC decking offers the most significant fade, stain, and mold resistance among decking products. The products are marketed as low-maintenance and are typically easy to clean and maintain. PVC decking typically doesn't require staining, sanding, or painting. It is sometimes partially composed of recycled plastic material, making it an environmentally friendly, efficient use of resources. The product is significantly lighter compared to wood composite products and can be bent and shaped to create custom configurations.

Disadvantages
Compared to other synthetic decking products, PVC is the most expensive. The 100% PVC makeup of the board makes it costlier than the wood powder/plastic mix used in composite decking. This cost means that PVC will be a more expensive investment up front, although manufacturers claim that the long life and low maintenance requirements of the deck make it an economical decision in the long run. PVC lacks the realistic feel of wood. Although manufacturers form the product with a realistic wood grain or brushstroke, some contractors and homeowners simply do not like the artificial sheen of the product. PVC is also formulated to resist scratches, stains, and mold, but some wear will still show over the life of the product.

See also
 Composite lumber
 Wood-plastic composite

References

Building materials
https://www.newdecks.ca/